"Family Reunion" is the first single from Saliva's sixth studio album, Cinco Diablo. Lead singer Josey Scott has said that the song is about meeting their fans on the road. The song peaked at #14 on Billboard's Mainstream Rock Tracks chart in 2008.

The song could be heard during NCAA College Basketball games televised on ESPN during the 2008-2009 season. It is also used by the Erie Otters during their pregame highlight video.

References

Saliva (band) songs
Song recordings produced by Bob Marlette
2008 songs
Songs written by Bob Marlette
Songs written by Josey Scott